Yang Fen (born July 31, 1982 in Hubei, China) is a Chinese-born Congolese table tennis player. She is also a three-time medalist at the 2007 All-Africa Games in Algiers, Algeria.

Yang represented the Republic of the Congo at the 2008 Summer Olympics in Beijing, where she competed in the women's singles. Yang reached the second preliminary round of the competition, where she lost to Romania's Elizabeta Samara, with a set score of 1–4.

References

External links

NBC 2008 Olympics profile

1982 births
Living people
Table tennis players from Wuhan
Chinese emigrants to the Republic of the Congo
Sportspeople of Chinese descent
Naturalised table tennis players
Naturalized citizens of Republic of the Congo
Sportspeople from Brazzaville
Chinese female table tennis players
Republic of the Congo table tennis players
Table tennis players at the 2008 Summer Olympics
Olympic table tennis players of the Republic of Congo
African Games gold medalists for the Republic of the Congo
African Games medalists in table tennis
African Games silver medalists for the Republic of the Congo
Competitors at the 2007 All-Africa Games